Roadblock: End of the Line was the second Roadblock professional wrestling livestreaming event produced by WWE. It was held exclusively for wrestlers from the promotion's Raw brand division. While the first Roadblock was streamed exclusively on the WWE Network, this second event also aired via traditional pay-per-view (PPV) outlets. It took place on December 18, 2016, at the PPG Paints Arena in Pittsburgh, Pennsylvania. The name of the event was a reference to it being WWE's final PPV of 2016. This was the final Roadblock until 2022 when WWE revived the event as a television special for the NXT brand.

Seven matches were contested at the event, including one match on the Kickoff pre-show. In the main event, WWE Universal Champion Kevin Owens retained the title against United States Champion Roman Reigns by disqualification when Chris Jericho attacked Owens. Other prominent matches included the team of Cesaro and Sheamus defeating The New Day (Big E and Kofi Kingston) for the Raw Tag Team Championship, ending New Day's record setting reign at 483 days, Rich Swann retaining the WWE Cruiserweight Championship against The Brian Kendrick and T. J. Perkins, Seth Rollins defeating Chris Jericho, and Charlotte Flair defeating Sasha Banks in overtime of a 30-minute Iron Man match to win her record fourth Raw Women's Championship.

Production

Background
In March 2016, WWE held an event titled Roadblock, which was originally a house show that was turned into a WWE Network-exclusive event to further build towards WrestleMania 32. The name was a reference to its position on the "Road to WrestleMania." Following the reintroduction of the brand extension in July, where the promotion again split its main roster into two separate brands called Raw and SmackDown where wrestlers were exclusively assigned to perform, the promotion brought back brand-exclusive pay-per-views (PPV). The Roadblock name was in turn reused for the Raw-exclusive December PPV and WWE Network event, which was held on December 18, 2016, at the PPG Paints Arena in Pittsburgh, Pennsylvania. This second Roadblock event was titled Roadblock: End of the Line due to it being WWE's final PPV of the year.

Storylines
The card included seven matches, including one on the Kickoff pre-show, that resulted from scripted storylines, where wrestlers portrayed villains, heroes, or less distinguishable characters in scripted events that built tension and culminated in a wrestling match or series of matches. Results were predetermined by WWE's writers on the Raw brand, while storylines were produced on WWE's weekly television shows, Monday Night Raw and 205 Live, the latter of which is cruiserweight-exclusive.

After being part of Team Raw's losing effort against Team SmackDown at Survivor Series, Chris Jericho and Kevin Owens got into a heated argument during Jericho's Highlight Reel on Raw. Jericho blamed Owens for using "The List of Jericho" as a weapon, whereas Owens explained that he tried to save Jericho from being eliminated. The two finally agreed that Roman Reigns and Seth Rollins were at fault for the loss. The same night, as a reward for having joined Team Raw, Rollins received another opportunity at Owens's WWE Universal Championship in a no disqualification match. Both Jericho, who had repeatedly interfered in Owens's title defenses and cost Rollins the Universal title, and Reigns were banned from ringside. Jericho, disguised as a masked fan, interfered nonetheless, allowing Owens to capitalize and retain the championship.

The following week, the friendship between Kevin Owens and Chris Jericho was disrupted, when Owens stated he did not need Jericho's help against the challenge of Roman Reigns. A disgruntled Jericho left the arena, but on the way out, he was attacked by Seth Rollins and suffered a Pedigree on top of a car, while Reigns defeated Owens to earn a title match for the Universal Championship at Roadblock. On the December 5 episode, Rollins stated that he would go through Jericho and Owens to get to Triple H, who had originally enabled Owens to win the Universal Championship against Rollins in a fatal four-way elimination match back in August. Owens then revealed that he had lobbied management to get Jericho two matches: Jericho would be facing Rollins at Roadblock and he would challenge Reigns for the United States Championship on Raw. Though Jericho told Owens to stay out of the match, Owens came to ringside to aid Jericho, but caused a distraction, which allowed Reigns to retain the title. The following week, Owens made amends with Jericho and got them a match against The New Day for the Raw Tag Team Championship. Later, General Manager Mick Foley added Rollins and Reigns to that match, making it a triple threat tag team match. During the match, the friendship again broke down between Owens and Jericho. At the close of the match, Rollins delivered a Pedigree to Jericho and The New Day capitalized on this to retain the championship. Afterwards, an argument ensued between Owens and Jericho. Jericho left and Reigns speared Owens.

On the November 28 episode of Raw, Sasha Banks defeated Charlotte Flair for the Raw Women's Championship in a Falls Count Anywhere match in Charlotte's hometown. After the match, Flair's father, Ric Flair, came out and congratulated Banks. The following week, Flair invoked her rematch clause; in response, Banks suggested a 30-minute Iron Man match at Roadblock, which Flair accepted. Later that night, Flair invited her father to the ring to publicly apologize for disowning him earlier in the year; the two hugged, but then Flair slapped him in the face, claiming that Ric turned his back on her. Banks came to Ric's aid, but was overpowered by Flair.

On the premiere episode of 205 Live on November 29, Rich Swann defeated The Brian Kendrick for the WWE Cruiserweight Championship. He subsequently retained the championship in a rematch the following week where T. J. Perkins was on commentary. After the match, Kendrick attacked Perkins, which resulted in a three-way brawl also involving Swann. On December 12, Swann was scheduled to defend the championship in a triple threat match against Kendrick and Perkins at Roadblock. On that night's Raw, Kendrick defeated Perkins in a singles match. The following night on 205 Live, Perkins defeated Swann by submission in a non-title match.

On the November 21 and November 28 episodes of Raw, Enzo Amore approached Rusev's wife,
Lana. On the December 5 episode, Rusev and Lana got into an argument and Rusev stormed off. Amore tried to console Lana and later that night, was invited to her hotel room. Once he got there, Lana enticed Amore to strip down to his underwear and then called for Rusev, who attacked Amore before dragging his unconscious body into the hallway. The following week, Rusev and Lana mocked Amore by showing replays of the attack. Amore's tag team partner, Big Cass, got into a brawl with Rusev and sent him into retreat. A match between Cass and Rusev was scheduled for the Roadblock Kickoff pre-show.

On the November 21 episode of Raw, General Manager Mick Foley put Sami Zayn in a match against Braun Strowman for failing to defeat The Miz at Survivor Series and bringing the Intercontinental Championship to Raw. Foley stopped the match when Zayn could not continue. The following week, Zayn demanded a rematch but Foley declined, telling Zayn that he could not beat Strowman. Zayn stormed off and on the December 12 episode, again asked for a rematch, but was again rejected. Zayn pondered switching to SmackDown because Foley did not believe in him. Following his match against Curtis Axel, Strowman declared that no one, including Zayn, could last two minutes with him. Later, after Zayn defeated Jinder Mahal, Foley told Zayn that he had arranged to trade Zayn to SmackDown in return for Eva Marie. An angry Zayn refused such a lopsided trade and again demanded for a rematch against Strowman. Foley yielded and scheduled Zayn to face Strowman at Roadblock in a match with a ten-minute time limit.

For several weeks, Tag Team Champions The New Day (Big E, Kofi Kingston, and Xavier Woods) had been hyping their Raw Tag Team Championship reign as they were soon overtaking Demolition's record of at 478 days as the longest reigning tag team champions in WWE history. On the November 21 and November 28 episodes of Raw, they retained their titles in back to back championship matches against Cesaro and Sheamus and then Luke Gallows and Karl Anderson, respectively. On the December 5 episode, a match pitting Cesaro and Sheamus against Gallows and Anderson to determine the number one contenders for the championship ended in a double countout as the two teams and New Day, who were doing commentary, brawled on the outside. Subsequently, a triple threat tag team championship match between the three teams was then scheduled for the following week. New Day won the match but in the ensuing celebration party, Woods accidentally sprayed champagne on Raw Commissioner Stephanie McMahon. As punishment, she forced New Day to defend the title a second time; New Day defeated Kevin Owens and Chris Jericho as well as Seth Rollins and Roman Reigns in a triple threat match, making their breaking Demolition's record inevitable. At WWE Tribute to the Troops, Cesaro and Sheamus earned another title shot at Roadblock by winning a fatal four-way tag team match.

Event

Pre-show
During the Roadblock: End of the Line Kickoff pre-show, Rusev faced Big Cass. The match ended when Lana feigned an ankle injury and Rusev attacked Enzo Amore during the distraction. As a concerned Cass checked on Amore, he was counted out, giving the win to Rusev.

Preliminary matches

The actual pay-per-view opened with The New Day (Big E and Kofi Kingston) defending the Raw Tag Team Championship against Cesaro and Sheamus. Throughout the match, all four competitors executed their respective moves and finishers, but could not get the win. Also, Xavier Woods interfered in the match on a few occasions, but Sheamus and Cesaro stayed in the match. In the end, as Sheamus was reaching for a tag, Cesaro pretended to tag in and entered the ring. Kingston, assuming Cesaro was the legal man, executed Trouble in Paradise on Cesaro and attempted to pin him only for Sheamus to roll him up for a pinfall victory, thus ending New Day's record setting title reign at 483 days.

Next, Sami Zayn faced Braun Strowman in a match in which he had to survive the 10-minute time limit. Strowman dominated most of the match. At about four minutes remaining in the match, Mick Foley appeared and presumed to throw in the towel for Zayn but Zayn threw the towel into the crowd. Zayn then sent Strowman into the ring post. Moments later, Strowman charged at Zayn, who moved out of the way, causing Strowman to crash into the timekeeper's area. When Strowman beat the count, Zayn executed a top-rope Crossbody for a nearfall. Zayn then performed a Helluva Kick on Strowman as the time limit expired. Zayn was declared the winner.

After that, Seth Rollins faced Chris Jericho. At the climax, Kevin Owens came out to distract Rollins, allowing Jericho to roll up Rollins for a nearfall. Jericho then argued with Owens and told Owens to leave. Jericho attempted a Codebreaker but Rollins countered into a Pedigree to win the match.

In the fourth match, Rich Swann defended the Cruiserweight Championship in a triple threat match against T. J. Perkins and Brian Kendrick. In the end, after Swann and Perkins performed a double superkick on Kendrick, Swann executed a Spin Kick on Perkins to win the match and retain the title. After the match, Neville returned and attacked Swann and Perkins, turning heel.

In the penultimate match, Sasha Banks defended the Raw Women's Championship against Charlotte Flair in a 30-minute Iron Man match. After Banks dominated, the momentum shifted when Charlotte caused Banks to fall face first on the steel ring steps. Later, Charlotte executed Natural Selection on Banks for a nearfall. Charlotte attempted a Moonsault, but Banks cut her off. However, Charlotte executed Natural Selection off the top rope on Banks to score the first point. Banks then rolled up Charlotte to make the score 1–1. Charlotte attempted a Moonsault, but Banks moved out of the way and applied the Bank Statement. Charlotte tried to make it to the bottom rope, but Banks brought her to the middle of the ring and reapplied the submission to force Charlotte to submit and make the score 2–1. Charlotte then focused on injuring Banks' leg for the remainder of the match. Banks managed a nearfall, but Charlotte applied the Figure Four Leglock. However, Banks was able to reverse the pressure, only for Charlotte to un-reverse it moments later. Banks attempted to get to the bottom rope, but Charlotte pulled her to the middle of the ring every time. Eventually, Charlotte bridged into the Figure Eight, and Banks submitted with just two seconds left on the clock, tying the score at 2–2 as the time expired. The referee ruled the match would continue in sudden death overtime. Banks managed two pinning combinations, but both resulted in nearfalls. In the end, Banks applied the Bank Statement, but Charlotte escaped by going after Banks' bad leg and applied the Figure Four Leglock. Charlotte bridged into the Figure Eight, and Banks, who had a bloodied nose at that point, eventually submitted. As a result, Charlotte won the match 3-2, and the title for a fourth time.

Main event
In the main event, Kevin Owens defended the WWE Universal Championship against United States Champion Roman Reigns. During the match, Owens performed two Frog Splashes off the barricade on Reigns, with the second one through the German broadcast table. After Reigns made it back in the ring before he was counted out, Owens performed another Frog Splash in the ring for a near-fall. Reigns attempted a Spear, but Owens countered and rolled-up Reigns for a near-fall. Owens performed a Pop Up Powerbomb on Reigns but Reigns placed his foot on the bottom rope to void the pin. In the end, Owens attempted to hit Reigns with the title belt, but Reigns responded with a Spear. Chris Jericho appeared and performed a Codebreaker on Owens, causing Owens to win by disqualification and retain the title. Jericho handed a shocked Owens the title belt and congratulated him, revealing that it was his plan to ensure that Owens won. As Owens and Jericho attempted to leave, Seth Rollins blocked their way. Reigns then attacked Owens with a Spear and Rollins executed a Pedigree on Jericho. Reigns and Rollins then put Jericho through the Spanish broadcast table with a Double Powerbomb. Afterwards, Owens tried to retreat, but Reigns and Rollins stopped him and performed another Double Powerbomb on Owens through the other broadcast table.

Aftermath
On the following episode of Raw, Kevin Owens and Chris Jericho celebrated, stating their friendship was even stronger now. Mick Foley then scheduled a rematch for the WWE Universal Championship between Owens and Roman Reigns at the Royal Rumble, and decided that Jericho would be suspended above the ring inside a shark cage, ensuring that Jericho would not interfere. He also threatened that if Jericho did not enter the cage, he would be fired. The following week, Rollins continued his antagonizing of Triple H, calling Triple H a coward to his wife Stephanie McMahon.

Also on Raw, Braun Strowman, angry at his failure to defeat Sami Zayn, began wreaking havoc backstage. Since Zayn was not present on Raw, Strowman attacked Titus O'Neil and Sin Cara during their match, and then attacked Roman Reigns and Seth Rollins in their tag team match against Kevin Owens and Chris Jericho. The following week, Zayn attacked Strowman during his match with Rollins, but was eventually chased out of the arena by Strowman. This culminated in a Last Man Standing match between the two, where Strowman won.

Big Cass lost a rematch against Rusev by disqualification after he continued to beat his opponent in the corner, ignoring the referee. Later, Enzo Amore was forced to attend a sensitivity training for accidentally exposing himself a few weeks back. After the session, Rusev and Jinder Mahal attacked Enzo. On the January 2, 2017 episode, Enzo and Cass were scheduled to face Rusev and Mahal in a tag team match, but due to Enzo's injury, Cass faced Rusev and Mahal in a handicap match, where he lost. Enzo was medically cleared to compete on the January 16 episode, where he and Cass defeated Rusev and Mahal.

Also on the following Raw, Sasha Banks came out in a knee brace and on a crutch and talked about her and Charlotte's long feud. She wanted to congratulate Charlotte, but instead was belittled and attacked by Nia Jax. Later, Charlotte declared herself to be the greatest female wrestler of all time, but was then interrupted by Bayley, beginning a feud between the two, resulting in Bayley becoming the number one contender for the Raw Women's Championship at the Royal Rumble.

Mick Foley congratulated Cesaro and Sheamus on their title victory and presented them with a new set of championship belts. The New Day (Kofi Kingston and Xavier Woods) invoked their rematch clause for the championship on the December 26 episode of Raw, but were unsuccessful. The champions then entered a feud with Luke Gallows and Karl Anderson, leading to a championship match on the January 16, 2017 episode of Raw that had a controversial ending. A rematch for the Royal Rumble Kickoff pre-show was scheduled with two referees.

Neville stated his intention to take out the entire cruiserweight division, now proclaiming himself "King of the Cruiserweights". This began a rivalry between Neville and Rich Swann, where on the January 10 episode of 205 Live, Swann accepted Neville's challenge for the WWE Cruiserweight Championship at the Royal Rumble.

Roadblock: End of the Line was the final event to carry the Roadblock name as another Roadblock was not scheduled for 2017. However, after five years, WWE revived the event for the NXT brand to be held as a special episode of NXT titled NXT Roadblock on March 8, 2022. A second NXT Roadblock was confirmed for the following year, thus establishing Roadblock as an annual March event for NXT.

Results

Iron Man match

References

External links 
 

WWE Roadblock
2016 WWE Network events
Professional wrestling in Pittsburgh
2016 in Pennsylvania
Events in Pittsburgh
2016 WWE pay-per-view events
December 2016 events in the United States
WWE Raw